Kazhuthurutty railway station (Code: KZTY) is a railway station in Kollam, Kerala and falls under the Madurai railway division of the Southern Railway zone, Indian Railways.

References

Railway stations in Kollam district
Madurai railway division